Kampong Siem ("Port of Siam") is a district (srok) located in Kampong Cham province, Cambodia. The district surrounds the provincial capital Kampong Cham City. The administrative center of the district locates not far from the Provincial capital of Kampong Cham in Ampil Leu Village, Ampil Commune about 3 km west from the center of Kampong Cham city on National Highway 7 and is 120 kilometres by road from Phnom Penh. The district borders on the western bank of the Mekong for most of its length.

In February 2007 the United States Peace Corps sent 29 volunteers to live in Kampong Siem District. This marked the beginning of the first ever Peace Corps mission in Cambodia. During a nine-week stay in the district the group of volunteers from San Francisco studied the Khmer language, acclimatised themselves to the local way of life, tried eating deep fried tarantulas and began teaching English.

Location 
Kampong Siem district is in central Kampong Cham Province and is surrounded by other Kampong Cham districts. Reading from the north clockwise, Kampong Cham shares a border with Stueng Trang district while Krouch Chhmar and Tbong Khmom districts form the eastern boundary. To the south of Kampong Siem is Koh Soutin district. The three districts of Kang Meas, Prey Chor and Chamkar Leu make up the western border of the district. Kampong Siem also surrounds the tiny Kampong Cham City which is the provincial capital.

Administration 
The Kampong Siem district governor reports to Hun Neng, the Governor of Kampong Cham. The following table shows the villages of Kampong Siem district by commune.

Demographics 
The district is subdivided into 15 communes (khum) and 112 villages (phum). According to the 1998 Census, the population of the district was 99,056 persons in 18,884 households in 1998. With a population of over 99,000 people, Kampong Siem is one of the more populated districts in Kampong Cham province. The average household size in Kampong Siem is 5.2 persons per household, slightly higher than the rural average for Cambodia (5.1). The sex ratio in the district is 92.0%, with more females than males.

References

External links
update 12-09-2019 by yim marin
Kampong Cham at Royal Government of Cambodia website
Kampong Cham at Ministry of Commerce website

Districts of Kampong Cham province